BSY most commonly refers to B. S. Yediyurappa, the current Chief Minister of Karnataka.

BSY may also refer to:

 Big Sky Airlines; ICAO airline code BSY
 Bored Suburban Youth, American hardcore punk band, 1985-88
 Brondesbury railway station, London; Network Rail station code BSY
 Bardera Airport, in Gedo, Somalia; ICAO airport code BSY
 Black Suit Youth, American alternative punk band 2004-present